PV Pride of the Murray, like many other Australian paddle wheelers, started out life as a timber logging barge. It was built at Echuca on the Murray River in 1924, and relaunched as a tourist vessel in 1977, also at Echuca. In 2022 the vessel was transported overland to Longreach, Queensland, for use as a tourist attraction on the Thompson River.

History
Pride of the Murray was built as the timber logging barge C24, at Echuca in 1924. Constructed by C Felshaw for the Murray River Sawmills, C24 took a team of twelve men between three and four months to complete.

In 1956, C24 was towed upstream by PS Oscar W for use during the construction of the new Barmah bridge. Following completion of the bridge, the barge was let go to drift downstream with the current (though still handled by two men) for five days to return to Echuca.

At the end of its working life it was abandoned and sunk in the River Murray (on the Victorian bank, just upstream of the Echuca-Moama Road Rail Bridge). Following the removal of over 250 tons of silt, the barge was refloated and repaired at the Moama slip. Multiple hull planks were renewed, and two decks of accommodation were subsequentially built up. Pride of the Murray was launched as a diesel-electric passenger vessel from the Echuca Wharf slipway in 1977. The vessel's helm was originally located forward on the main deck, however due to the location of passenger seating the wheel was relocated to the upper deck.

Pride of the Murray, in conjunction with PS Canberra and PS Emmylou, was formerly operated by Murray River Paddlesteamers as a tourist attraction in Echuca. It ran hour-long journeys up and down the river daily, a 'Riverlunch' cruise, and was also available to charter privately.

In 2022, Pride of the Murray was purchased by Outback Pioneers, located in Longreach, Queensland. The paddle vessel was relocated  to the Thompson River by a 26 metre-long 700HP prime mover featuring 106 tyres, joining the Thomson Belle as part of the Outback Pioneers fleet.

On 6 March 2023, Pride of the Murray sank at its moorings, progressively listing, then capsising onto its port side and becoming completely submerged. Salvage of the vessel was expected to take a week.

Particulars
Pride of the Murray has dimensions 25.1m x 4.9m x 1.5m. Her paddle-wheels were acquired from the wreck of the PS Hero, which was burned and sank in 1957.

The vessel was named after the earlier PS Pride of the Murray, a stern-wheeler paddle steamer built by Johnston and Davies at Echuca in 1865.

References

External links 
 Murray River Paddlesteamers

Paddle steamers of Australia
1924 ships
Echuca-Moama